Andy is the second studio album by British R&B singer and songwriter Raleigh Ritchie, released on 26 June 2020 on Alacran Records. It was produced by Grades and Chris Loco and promoted by singles "Time in a Tree", "Aristocrats" and "Squares".

Track listing

References 

2020 albums
Albums produced by Chris Loco
Albums produced by Grades
Raleigh Ritchie albums